Swedish bandy clubs play in the Swedish bandy league system, where the top-tier is Elitserien and lower levers are Allsvenskan, Division 1 and Division 2. The lower levels are in turn divided into groups based on geography.

The Swedish championship is decided through a play-off for the eight best teams in Elitserien each year; the Swedish championship has been played every year since 1907. There is also a Swedish domestic cup tournament, Svenska Cupen, since 2005.

Here is a list of clubs which have an article at the English Wikipedia:

Defunct teams
 IF Boltic
 Oxelösunds IK

External links
  bandysidan
  svenskbandy (Swedish only)

 
Bandy